Jutta Pauliina Urpilainen (born 4 August 1975) is a Finnish politician. She was the first female chair of the Social Democratic Party of Finland, which she led from 2008 to 2014. She was the Minister of Finance of Finland from 2011 to 2014. Since 1 December 2019, she is the European Commissioner for International Partnerships in the European Commission led by Ursula von der Leyen.

Early life and education
Born in Lapua, Southern Ostrobothnia, Urpilainen is the daughter of former politician Kari Urpilainen. She studied at the University of Jyväskylä, where she graduated with a Master's of Education in 2002. During her undergraduate studies, she spent an Erasmus year in Vienna. She worked as a school teacher until her election to Parliament.

Political career

Early beginnings 
Urpilainen served as president of the Young European Federalists of Finland in 2001. She joined the Kokkola city in 2001.

Member of Parliament and party leadership 
Urpilainen was a member of Parliament for the Vaasa constituency from the 2003 national elections. In parliament, she was a member of the Committee on Education and Culture and a deputy member of the Finance Committee. In addition to her parliamentary work, she was also a member of the Advisory Council of the Finnish Institute of International Affairs.

Urpilainen was elected as the chair of the Social Democratic Party in June 2008, succeeding former Deputy Prime Minister and Minister of Finance Eero Heinäluoma. She won on the second ballot, defeating former Minister for Foreign Affairs Erkki Tuomioja by 218 votes to 132. During her tenure from 2008 until 2014, support for the Social Democrats fell from 21 to 15.5 percent. However, in the 2011 elections, she returned the party to government after four years.

Minister of Finance 
After the 2011 parliamentary election, in which the SDP became the second-largest party, Urpilainen was appointed Minister of Finance and Deputy Prime Minister in the cabinet led by Jyrki Katainen. In this capacity, she also chaired the meetings of the Nordic Council Ministers of Finance in 2012.

The surge of the eurosceptic True Finns party in the 2011 elections sparked a move from the Social Democrats under Urpilainen to toughen their stance on the euro significantly, leading Finland to become the only country to demand collateral from Greece and Spain as part of their international rescues. On 6 July 2012, Urpilainen said the following on her website: "Finland would prefer to consider leaving the Eurozone rather than to pay other countries' debts in the currency area." International news media, such as The Daily Telegraph, misinterpreted the statement as a threat that Finland would leave the eurozone. Urpilainen's assistant Matti Hirvola later clarified her statements and that she had meant that Finland did not wish to be responsible for paying other countries' debt deposits. Only one month later, Urpilainen had to revise the government's growth target for that fiscal year down to zero as exports slowed; the only Eurozone countries that fared worse were Greece and Portugal.

Urpilainen sought another term as party chair in the Social Democratic Party's 2014 party conference in May. She was narrowly defeated by her challenger, Antti Rinne, in a 257 to 243 vote. Urpilainen subsequently stepped down as the Minister of Finance in June.

Ahead of the 2018 presidential elections, Urpilainen was widely mentioned as a potential candidate. By February 2017, she announced she would not seek the presidency.

From 2017 until 2019, Urpilainen served as Minister of Foreign Affairs Timo Soini’s Special Representative on Mediation.

European Commissioner 
On 1 December 2019, Urpilainen assumed the office of European Commissioner in the Von der Leyen Commission, with the portfolio of international partnerships.

Other activities

European Union organizations
 European Investment Bank (EIB), Ex-Officio Member of the Board of Governors (2011–2014)
 European Stability Mechanism (ESM), Member of the Board of Governors (2012–2014)

International organizations
 Joint World Bank-IMF Development Committee, Member (2013–2014)
 European Bank for Reconstruction and Development (EBRD), Ex-Officio Member of the Board of Governors (2011–2014)
 Nordic Investment Bank (NIB), Ex-Officio Member of the Board of Governors (2011–2014)
 Multilateral Investment Guarantee Agency (MIGA), World Bank Group, Ex-Officio Member of the Board of Governors (2011–2014)
 World Bank, Ex-Officio Member of the Board of Governors (2011–2014)

Corporate boards
 Veikkaus, Member of the Board of Directors (2017–2018)

Non-profit organizations
 Crisis Management Initiative (CMI), Member of the Board (since 2019)
 Finnish National Opera Foundation, Member of the Board (2017–2018)
 Finnish Innovation Fund (SITRA), Member of the Supervisory Board (2017–2018)
 Finnish National Commission for UNESCO, Chair (2015–2018)

Personal life
Urpilainen is married to Juha Mustonen, an official in the Finish Ministry for Foreign Affairs . In 2017 and 2019, they adopted two children from Colombia.

In 2002, Urpilainen recorded a Christmas album called “Christmassy thoughts” featuring versions of  “Winter Wonderland” and “Jingle Bells.”

References

External links 
  Official website
  Official website

|-

|-

|-

1975 births
Living people
People from Lapua
Finnish Lutherans
Leaders of the Social Democratic Party of Finland
Deputy Prime Ministers of Finland
Ministers of Finance of Finland
Members of the Parliament of Finland (2003–07)
Members of the Parliament of Finland (2007–11)
Members of the Parliament of Finland (2011–15)
Members of the Parliament of Finland (2015–19)
Members of the Parliament of Finland (2019–23)
Finnish European Commissioners
Women European Commissioners
Women government ministers of Finland
Women members of the Parliament of Finland
Female finance ministers
21st-century Finnish women politicians
European Commissioners 2019–2024